Dopesick Nation, also known as "American Junkie" and "American Relapse" is an American documentary television series that premiered on September 12, 2018. The series takes place in southern Florida and follows two recovering addicts, Allie and Frankie, and their journey to take on the opioid epidemic by assisting as many addicts into recovery as they can. The series also sheds light on the "recovery capital of America", Delray Beach, and the corruption and exploitation that exist in the rehab industry.

Episodes

References

2010s American documentary television series
Television shows filmed in Florida
2018 American television series debuts
Television shows about drugs
Opioids in the United States